Herriott is a surname. Notable people with the surname include:

John Herriott, Lieutenant Governor of Iowa 1902–1907
Maurice Herriott (born 1939), British athlete
Murray Herriott, New Zealand figure skater
Elizabeth Herriott, New Zealand botanist and university teacher

See also
Heriot (disambiguation)
Herriot